The Church of the Holy Wisdom of God or Saint Sophia Church ― was a Russian Orthodox church in Nakhchivan-on-Don (which currently form a part of Rostov-on-Don city) Rostov Oblast, Russia.

History 
Nakhichevan-on-Don was originally formed by Armenian settlers, but since the town was close to Rostov-on-Don, where the Russian population was predominant, Nakhichevan could not remain a mononational Armenian city for a long time. Soon in the town appeared Russian Orthodox population, who needed their own churches.

St. Sophia Church was built in 1863 in Pervomayskaya Street. The church had one dome that was made of wood, stood on a stone basement and had a single-tier belfry. Its height was 15 meters. Near the church in the same year 1863 there was erected a one-story brick building of Russian parochial school.

In 1904, instead of the wooden Sofia Church, the construction of a stone church designed by architect V. V. Popov began and was completed in 1912.

This church did not last for a quarter of a century. In 1934 it was closed and dismantled for building materials. At first, all the side domes and walls were removed, although the central dome had rested for some more time on four columns. In the end, these columns were also blown up. Next to the place of the former St. Sophia Church, the building of School No. 11 was constructed.

In the last years of the church's existence, the future Georgian Metropolitan Zinovy (Mazhuga) served there.

References 

Churches in Rostov Oblast
Churches completed in 1912
Buildings and structures demolished in 1934
Demolished churches in the Soviet Union
Russian Orthodox church buildings in Russia